I-182 (originally I-82) was am Imperial Japanese Navy Kaidai-type cruiser submarine of the KD7 sub-class commissioned in 1943. During World War II, she was lost in 1943 while on her first war patrol.

Design and description
The submarines of the KD7 sub-class were medium-range attack submarines developed from the preceding KD6 sub-class. They displaced  surfaced and  submerged.

For surface running, the submarines were powered by two  diesel engines, each driving one propeller shaft. When submerged, each propeller was driven by a  electric motor. The submarines could reach  on the surface and  submerged.

The submarines were armed with six internal  torpedo tubes, all in the bow. They carried one reload for each tube, a total of 12 torpedoes. They were originally intended to be armed with two twin-gun mounts for the  Type 96 anti-aircraft gun, but a  deck gun was substituted for one 25 mm mount during construction.

Construction and commissioning
I-182 was laid down at the Yokosuka Naval Arsenal in Yokosuka, Japan, on 10 November 1941 as I-82. Renamed I-182 on 20 May 1942, she was launched on 30 May 1942. She was completed and commissioned on 10 May 1943.

Service history

First war patrol
I-182 departed Sasebo, Japan, on 8 August 1943 bound for Truk Atoll in the Caroline Islands, which she reached on 15 August 1943. She got underway from Truk on 22 August 1943 to begin her first war patrol, assigned a patrol area in the vicinity of Espiritu Santo in the New Hebrides. She did not return from her patrol.

Loss

The exact circumstances of I-182′s loss remain unknown. I-182 and the submarine  both were patrolling in the vicinity of the New Hebrides at the time, and neither returned. United States Navy forces reported two successful antisubmarine attacks off Espiritu Santo in early September 1943.

The first action took place on 1 September 1943, when the destroyer , operating as part of a hunter-killer group, began a search for a reported Japanese submarine off Espiritu Santo at 10:55. The submarine turned to port just before Wadsworth launched the depth charges, then headed south before turning northeast, creating an underwater wake that degraded Wadsworth′s sonar detection capability. This resulted in a  very large air bubble rising to the surface, but no other sign of a submarine in distress. Wadsworth continued to pursue the submarine, which maneuvered to create more underwater turbulence in an attempt to defeat Wadsworth′s sonar. A PBY Catalina flying boat reported debris and a  oil slick that smelled like diesel fuel on the surface just south of the location of Wadsworth′s final attack.

The second action occurred on 3 September 1943, when the destroyer  conducted a sweep for a reported Japanese submarine off Espiritu Santo. After Ellet received no reply, she illuminated the area with star shells. Between 20:12 and 20:38 Ellet conducted a series of depth charge attacks.

The submarines Wadsworth and Ellet sank remain unidentified. It seems likely that one of them was I-182 and the other I-20.

On 15 September 1943, the Japanese sent I-182 orders to return to Truk, but she did not acknowledge the signal. On 22 October 1943, the Imperial Japanese Navy declared I-182 lost with her entire crew of 87 men off Espiritu Santo.

Notes

References
 
 
 
 

1942 ships
Ships built by Yokosuka Naval Arsenal
Kaidai-class submarines
World War II submarines of Japan
Maritime incidents in September 1943
World War II shipwrecks in the Pacific Ocean
Ships lost with all hands

Submarines sunk by United States warships